Matías Bortolín Vara (born April 11, 1993) is an Argentine professional basketball player. He plays at the center position.

Professional career
In his pro career, Bortolín has played in both the 2nd-tier South American League, and the 1st-tier FIBA Americas League.

National team career
Bortolín has been a member of the senior Argentine national basketball team. With Argentina, he has played at the 2013 FIBA AmeriCup, where he won a bronze medal, and at the 2014 FIBA World Cup.

External links
FIBA Profile
Latinbasket.com Profile

1993 births
Living people
2014 FIBA Basketball World Cup players
Argentine expatriate basketball people in Austria
Argentine expatriate basketball people in Italy
Argentine men's basketball players
Argentino de Junín basketball players
Atenas basketball players
Basket Rimini Crabs players
Basketball players at the 2015 Pan American Games
Centers (basketball)
Club Comunicaciones (Mercedes) basketball players
Club San Martín de Corrientes basketball players
Obras Sanitarias basketball players
Pan American Games competitors for Argentina
Regatas Corrientes basketball players
Sportspeople from Córdoba, Argentina
Traiskirchen Lions players